Richard Harry Graves (17 July 1897 – 3 February 1971) was an Irish-born Australian poet and novelist.

He was born in Waterford, the home city of his father, Christen Gerald Graves. His father emigrated to Australia in 1909 and Richard followed him in 1911. He served in the First World War with the 25th Infantry Battalion of the Australian Imperial Force and was wounded at Gallipoli.

In the Second World War, Graves founded and led the Australian Jungle Rescue Detachment of 60 soldiers, which was attached to the Far East American Airforce.  These men conducted over 300 rescues, all of which were completed successfully and without losses.  After the war he ran a bushcraft school for over twenty years.

Aside from poetry and adventure novels for children, he wrote ten classic books on camping and bushcraft, now published in a single volume. He was a cousin of the English writer Robert Graves.

References

See also https://recordsearch.naa.gov.au/SearchNRetrieve/Interface/ViewImage.aspx?B=403485 (accessed 31 January 2021) for official records of Lieutenant Richard Graves’ initiation, command and development of an Australian Jungle Training Detachment (AJTD), including its evolved rescue role in NG, DNG and the Philippines.  Graves was officer commanding AJTD from mid January to 29 December 1944.

See Kreuger, B. (2020) KAIS: The true story of a daring rescue of a bomber crew from the swamps of New Guinea, summer 1944, Van Kinsbergen Publishing. This is an account of a deep jungle rescue involving members of Grave’s AJTD.

See Brown, C.  Richard Graves – The Father of Modern Australian Bushcraft, Australian Bushcraft Magazine, October 2015, pp. 57–66. This provides additional information on the AJTD, his post war Bushcraft Association (1947–68) and its training activities. Available at https://archive.org/details/AusBushcraftMagOct15Free/page/n53/mode/2up) (accessed 31 January 2021).

1897 births
1971 deaths
20th-century Australian novelists
20th-century Australian male writers
Irish poets
Irish novelists
Australian children's writers
Australian male novelists
Australian non-fiction writers
Survivalists
Australian male poets
Irish male novelists
20th-century Australian poets
Male non-fiction writers
Irish emigrants to Australia (before 1923)